The 1915 Denver Pioneers football team represented the University of Denver as a member of the Rocky Mountain Conference (RMC) during the 1915 college football season. In their first season under head coach John Fike, the team compiled a 4–3 record (2–3 against conference opponents), finished fifth in the RMC, and outscored opponents by a total of 103 to 83.

Schedule

References

Denver
Denver Pioneers football seasons
Denver Pioneers football